The 2018 Brent London Borough Council election took place on 3 May 2018 to elect members of Brent London Borough Council in England. This was on the same day as other local elections.

Results

|}

Results by ward

Alperton

Barnhill

Brondesbury Park

Dollis Hill

Dudden Hill

Fryent

Harlesden

Kensal Green

Kenton

Kilburn

Mapesbury

Northwick Park

Preston

Queensbury

Queens Park

Stonebridge

Sudbury

Tokyngton

Welsh Harp

Wembley Central

Willesden Green
Willesden Green ward elections were put on hold following death of incumbent Labour councillor Lesley Jones. The election was eventually held on 21 June.

2018–2022 by elections

References

2018
2018 London Borough council elections